CREB3 regulatory factor is a protein that in humans is encoded by the CREBRF gene.

References

Further reading